This is a list of the NCAA indoor champions in a middle distance event.  Generally that was the 880 yard run until 1983, and the 800 meters being contested thereafter.  The event was not held in 1986-7.  Hand timing was used until 1975, starting in 1976 fully automatic timing was used.

Champions
Key
y=yards
w=wind aided
A=Altitude assisted

880 Yards

800 Meters

References

NCAA Indoor Track and Field Championships
800 metres